Cheiridopsis peculiaris is a species of succulent plant in the genus Cheiridopsis native to South Africa. Its name refers to the peculiar leaf shape compared to other species in its genus. Like other Cheiridopsis it has leaf pairs, but unusually the outer pair grows flat along the ground while the other pair faces toward the sky.

References

peculiaris
Plants described in 1926